Consort Yangje of the Changwon Hwang clan (Hangul: 양제 황씨, Hanja: 良娣 黃氏) was a Korean royal consort as the wife of Crown Prince Sunhoe. She was firstly chosen as the crown princess by Jeong Nan-jeong (정난정) but later demoted to Yangje after discovered that she had a colic disease and then died not long after that.

References

Royal consorts of the Joseon dynasty
Year of birth unknown
Changwon Hwang clan
Year of death unknown